The 2016 Season saw Coventry Bears compete once again the RFL League 1, the third tier of professional rugby league in Britain, in only their second professional season. The Coventry Bears improved upon the previous season by claiming an 11th place position with 8 wins to their credit under their coach, Tom Tsang.

Results

References

External links
Official website

Rugby league teams in the West Midlands (county)
Sport in Coventry
2016 in English rugby league
2016 in rugby league by club